Eyes Set to Kill is the sixth studio album by American metalcore band Eyes Set to Kill, released on February 16, 2018 via Century Media Records. In March 2017, "Break" was released as the first single from the album. The album is the first by the band to not include any screamed vocals.

Track listing
Adapted from Brave Words.

Credits 

Band
 Alexia Rodriguez – vocals, guitars, bass

 Anissa Rodriguez – bass guitar
 Caleb Clifton – drums, percussion

 Additional personnel
 Joe Graves – composer, production, mastering, mixing	
 Sam Graves – composer, production, mastering, mixing
 Mitch Marlow – composer
 Sahaj Ticotin – composer
 Kane Churko – composer
 Rob Walden – design, art direction

Charts

References

2018 albums
Eyes Set to Kill albums
Century Media Records albums